Vsevolod Pavlovich Savich (Savicz; 19 February 1885 – 25 May 1972) was a Soviet lichenologist. He headed the Section of Cryptogamic Plants of the Komarov Botanical Institute of the Academy of Sciences of the USSR. Savicz died in Leningrad in 1972. The crustose lichen Caloplaca saviczii is named in his honour.

See also
 :Category:Taxa named by Vsevolod Savich

References

1885 births
1972 deaths
Soviet lichenologists